Tracerco is the oil and gas services subsidiary of British chemical company and conglomerate Johnson Matthey.

History 
In 1958, Imperial Chemical Industries (ICI) established a division to research the use of ionizing radiation within chemical processes.  They found it was not possible to use it as a catalyst, but found it could be used to assess/diagnose within the chemical process, typically ahead of plant turnarounds.  In the 1960s the division was named Physics and Radioisotope Services, performing flow studies, heat exchanger leakage tests and column scans on a chemical plant in the UK.  To support the work being done in hazardous areas, a range of Intrinsically safe radiation monitors were developed.  Most of this early work was later recorded by Peter Jackson.

In 1967, the first nuclear gauge was developed to measure the level within a vessel at Billingham chemical works.  The Specialist Measurement Instruments section was established with a range of level, trip and Nuclear density gauges, typical application of which is slug catchers and separation vessels.

A General Atomics Triga 250 kW Mark 1 nuclear reactor was operated from 1971 to 1998.  This was used to create short half-life radioisotopes for use in chemical plant diagnostics, sample analysis and forensic work.

In the 1970s, the business supported development North Sea oil industry, selling a range of services and nucleonic gauges.  In the 1980s bases were established in Aberdeen, Scotland, Houston, Texas, Sarnia, Ontario and Edmonton, Alberta. Subsea gauges were developed for grout monitoring.  Subsea nucleonic gauge level system was developed for Texaco Highlander Slug Catcher Tartan tieback.  As well as techniques to assess and diagnose fluidised catalytic cracking units.

In the 1990s, a range of Flooded Member Inspection and Pipeline Inspection Gauge (PIG) Tracking services used in pipeline pigging campaigns.  Tracer technologies were developed to allow oil companies to characterise fluid flow in oil and gas reservoirs and inside production wells.

The Tracerco Profiler entered the market in 2000, this Nuclear density gauge allows customers to see into their separator.  This product received the Queen's Award for Innovation in 2003. In 2007, this instrument was deployed on Statoil's Tordis module, the world's first subsea oil and gas production facility.

Imperial Chemical Industries sold the group to Johnson Matthey in 2002.

The 2000's saw international expansion once again when Tracerco bought the Process Diagnostics division of QuestTruTec in 2006 to become the largest supplier of nucleonic diagnostic services currently in operation. Regional expansion then followed with offices opening in Perth, Australia, Baku, Azerbaijan and Abu Dhabi.

In 2009, Tracerco announced the acquisition of Belgium-based Process Vision Services (PVS). The acquisition facilitated the provision of Tracerco's more extensive range of process tracing and characterisation technologies amongst clients throughout the refining and petrochemical industry in Europe and North Africa.

Also in 2009, Tracerco was awarded its third Queen's Award for Enterprise. This was for the innovation of its radiation monitoring instruments that are certified with intrinsic safety.

Discovery, the world's first subsea technology to provide medical grade CT scan information for pipeline inspection was launched to the world's oil and gas industry in 2013. Discovery can measure pipe wall thickness through any type of pipeline coating to allow operators to make decisions about the short, medium and long term future of a subsea pipeline.

Business Operations 

The company has 8 business areas:
 Instrumentation provides a full range of Nucleonic measurement solutions including level, density and interface measurement, which are certified for installation in hazardous areas and subsea.
 Process Diagnostics can diagnose a wide range of production problems using sophisticated tracer and advanced measurement technology.
 Subsea Technologies helps oil and gas operators better understand flow assurance issues and ensure the integrity of their subsea assets.
 Radiation Monitors offers a range of Intrinsically Safe and Non-Intrinsically Safe Radiation Monitors, which can be used to measure radiation dose rate or characterise process and environmental contaminants.
 Radiation Protection Advice and Radiation Protection Supervisor Training provide a range of services to ensure client operational safety and compliance with national and international Radiological legislation.
 Reservoir Characterisation enable customers to optimise the recovery of hydrocarbons from both new and mature reservoirs.
 Analytical Services offer a range of standard and bespoke analytical and diagnostic techniques.
 Fuel Security provides a range of unique covert molecular markers, which are tailored to suit the application.

See also
 List of oilfield service companies

References

External links 
 Tracerco's Official homepage

Companies based in County Durham